Calephelis arizonensis, the Arizona metalmark, is a species of metalmark in the butterfly family Riodinidae. It is found in North America.

The MONA or Hodges number for Calephelis arizonensis is 4394.

References

Further reading

External links

 

Riodinini
Articles created by Qbugbot